Parona is a comune (municipality) in the Province of Pavia in the Italian region Lombardy, located about 40 km southwest of Milan and about 35 km northwest of Pavia. As of 31 December 2004, it had a population of 1,793 and an area of 9.3 km².

Parona borders the following municipalities: Albonese, Cilavegna, Mortara, Vigevano.

Demographic evolution

References

External links
 www.comune.parona.pv.it/

Cities and towns in Lombardy